Union Bank (known as MUFG UnionBank until 2022) is a nationally licensed full service bank with 398 branches in California, Washington and Oregon that was wholly owned by MUFG Americas Holdings and was acquired by U.S. Bancorp. Headquartered in New York City, it has commercial branches in Dallas, Houston, New York and Chicago, in addition to two international offices.

Formerly known as Union Bank of California, N.A., it was acquired by the U.S. Bancorp on December 1, 2022.

History

Union Bank 
In 1914, Kaspare Cohn founded Kaspare Cohn Commercial & Savings Bank in Los Angeles. It was renamed Union Bank & Trust Company of Los Angeles in 1918.  Harry Volk was recruited from Prudential Insurance Company as the bank's new CEO in 1957 and pioneered the use of the one-bank holding company, among other banking innovations.
  Volk retired in 1980 after the purchase of the bank by London-based Standard Chartered Bank in 1979.

MUFG Bank, Ltd.

Meanwhile, the Bank of Tokyo established the Bank of Tokyo California in 1953 in San Francisco. In 1975, Bank of Tokyo California purchased San Diego's Southern California First National Bank, shortening its name to California First. Four years later Bank of Tokyo California, via California First, took over Union Bank and adopted its name.

In May 1996, Mitsubishi Bank and the Bank of Tokyo merged in Japan. In San Francisco, the Bank of California, N.A. merged with and into Union Bank, N.A., and the merged entity, Union Bank of California, N.A. became a direct subsidiary of the bank holding company, UnionBanCal Corporation. With the merger, Union Bank could now trace its history back to the founding of the Bank of California 132 years before. In 1999, UnionBanCal Corporation became a publicly traded company listed on the New York Stock Exchange (NYSE:UB).

In August 2008, Mitsubishi UFJ offered to buy the 35 percent of Union Bank it did not already own, which Union Bank accepted.
On November 4, 2008, the Bank of Tokyo-Mitsubishi UFJ (BTMU), a wholly owned subsidiary of Mitsubishi UFJ Financial Group (MUFG), announced that BTMU had successfully acquired all of the outstanding shares of UnionBanCal Corporation.

In 2014, MUFG integrated the U.S. operations of its subsidiary The Bank of Tokyo-Mitsubishi UFJ, Ltd. (BTMU) with those of San Francisco–based Union Bank, N.A.

In April 2018, the Bank of Tokyo-Mitsubishi UFJ, Ltd. (BTMU) was renamed to MUFG Bank, Ltd.

When it was called MUFG UnionBank, it was a subsidiary of intermediate holding company, MUFG Americas Holdings Corporation, and a member of the Mitsubishi UFJ Financial Group. 

As of December 31, 2021, MUFG Americas Holdings Corporation had US$163 billion in assets and the Mitsubishi UFJ Financial Group had total assets of approximately US$3.4 trillion. Its foundation is built on six lineages; three originating in California and three in Japan (Bank of Tokyo, Mitsubishi Bank and UFJ Bank).

U.S. Bancorp
On September 21, 2021, U.S. Bancorp agreed to purchase MUFG Union Bank's consumer business for $8 billion. It is the bank's biggest deal since 2001 when it merged with Milwaukee-based Firstar Corp. for $21 billion. The deal with MUFG Union Bank will add $58 billion in loans to U.S. Bancorp's current base of $294 billion and will give U.S. Bancorp a large presence on the U.S. West Coast, especially California.  The combined bank will have $723 billion in assets.

U.S. regulatory approval for the merger was announced on October 16 of 2022. The acquisition was completed on December 1, 2022.

Controversies
On October 19, 2004, the Federal Reserve Board announced that Union Bank had entered into a written agreement to avoid criminal prosecution for money laundering. Three years later, Union Bank was again accused of money-laundering and in September 2007, the Department of Justice and the Treasury Department announced that Union Bank had agreed to pay $31.6 million in penalties and forfeitures to settle government claims that it had been implicated in an elaborate drug money laundering scheme involving Mexican exchange houses known as casas de cambio.

Acquisitions and their founding dates

 1864 The Bank of California
 1883 First National Bank
 1905 The London and San Francisco Bank
 1918 The Bank of Personal Service
 1952 The Bank of Tokyo of California
 1957 Occidental Savings & Commercial Bank (North Hollywood)
 1958 Union Bank
 1967 Southern California First National Bank
 1972 Mitsubishi Bank of California
 1975 California First Bank
 1984 Bancal Tri-State Corporation – holding company for The Bank of California
 2002 First Western Bank
 2004 Business Bank of California
 2010 Tamalpais Bank – per purchase and assumption agreement with the FDIC  
 2010 Frontier Bank – per purchase and assumption agreement with the FDIC
 2012 Pacific Capital Bancorp – holding company for Santa Barbara Bank & Trust

In 2009, Union Bank opened a commercial branch in Texas, with plans to expand.

On April 30, 2010, Union Bank, N.A., acquired certain assets and assumed certain liabilities of Everett, Washington-based Frontier Bank in a purchase and assumption agreement with the Federal Deposit Insurance Corporation (FDIC). Twelve officers and corporate directors of Frontier Bank are facing a $46 million damage lawsuit filed by the FDIC.

Also in April, Union Bank acquired the assets of Tamalpais Bank in Marin County, including seven branches. Federal regulators sold Tamalpais' assets to Union Bank, which rebranded all the acquired branches.

In 2012, Union Bank announced its acquisition of Pacific Capital Bancorp, which operated under the name Santa Barbara Bank & Trust, for $1.5 billion.

In 2013, Union Bank completed the acquisition of First Bank Association Bank Services, which provides a full range of banking services to homeowners associations and community management companies. The acquisition brought to Union Bank approximately $550 million in deposits.

In 2021, U.S. Bancorp announced that it has agreed to buy MUFG Union Bank's core retail banking operations for approximately $8 billion in cash and stock. In September 2022, MUFG Union Bank and US Bank mutually agreed to extend the termination date of the merger from September 30 to December 31, 2022. The deal closed in December 2022.

PurePoint Financial: Savings Only Division
PurePoint Financial, the savings only division of MUFG Union Bank, offers high interest rates on savings accounts and certificates of deposit.

Corporate social responsibility

Community Reinvestment Act
Union Bank's board of directors approves the bank's Community Service Action Plan (CSAP), which is used to ensure the bank's compliance with Community Reinvestment Act requirements. The CSAP targets seven key areas for support and services: affordable housing, banking services, community outreach, corporate contributions, low-income consumer loans, small business loans and assistance, and supplier diversity.

See also

 Bank of California
 UnionBanCal Corporation

References

External links
 

1996 establishments in California
American companies established in 1996
American subsidiaries of foreign companies
Banks based in California
Banks established in 1996
Companies based in San Francisco
Financial District, San Francisco
Mitsubishi companies
Mitsubishi UFJ Financial Group
2022 mergers and acquisitions
U.S. Bancorp